Mario Vušković (born 16 November 2001) is a Croatian professional footballer currently playing as a centre-back for 2. Bundesliga club Hamburger SV.

Club career 
Vušković started playing football by joining RNK Split academy, before moving to the academy of Dalmatian giants Hajduk Split in 2016. Initially a defensive midfielder, he was moved back to the centre back position in the youth teams. In October 2018, he was included in The Guardian's Next Generation list.

On 18 August 2019, Vušković made his Prva HNL debut for Hajduk in the 3–0 victory over Gorica. However, he did not proceed to get many opportunities during Damir Burić's tenure at the club. On 16 November, he fractured his arm while on international duty in Elbasan, in Croatia U20's friendly 1–0 victory over Albania, which sidelined him for three months. During the tenure of Igor Tudor at the club, Vušković solidified his spot in the starting XI following the COVID-19 suspension of the league and injuries of Ardian Ismajli and Nihad Mujakić. He scored his first goal for Hajduk Split on the 16 June 2020 in the 2–3 defeat to Varaždin. On 25 July, the last matchday, he was shown two yellow cards and sent off in the 1–4 victory over Inter Zaprešić.

Ahead of and during the 2020–21 season, Vušković attracted attention of various Serie A clubs, most notably Napoli. However, club president Lukša Jakobušić stopped the transfer, dubbing Vušković the "club project". On 27 January 2021, Vušković scored the opener in a 3–1 derby defeat to Dinamo Zagreb. On 20 March, he assisted Marin Ljubičić for the only goal in a 1–0 derby victory over Šibenik. In the beginning of May, Vušković sparked significant interest from Celtic and Torino. On 12 May, he scored the first goal and provided Stipe Biuk with an assist for the fourth in a 4–0 victory over Gorica.

On 31 August 2021, Vušković signed a two-year loan deal with 2. Bundesliga club Hamburger SV, with an option to buy. He made his debut on 18 September in a 2–0 victory over Werder Bremen. Despite initial struggles, within the first three months he became a nailed-on starter, and his performances led to the club signing him permanently on 15 March 2022. On 16 April, Vušković scored his debut goal for Hamburg, a free kick in a 3–0 victory over Karlsruhe.

International career 
Vušković was part of Dario Bašić's 18-man squad for UEFA Under-17 Euro 2017. He made one appearance at the tournament, in the 1–1 draw with Spain, as Croatia finished at the bottom of the group.

He earned his first call-up to Croatia under-21 team in August 2020, ahead of UEFA Under-21 Euro 2021 qualifiers against Greece and the Czech Republic. He made his debut on 12 November, in a 2–2 away draw with Scotland. On 9 March 2021, Vušković was named in Igor Bišćan's 23-man squad for the group stage of the tournament. On 17 May, he was named in Bišćan's 23-man squad for the knockout stage of the tournament.

Personal life 
Vušković's great-grandfather Marko made three appearances for Hajduk Split on the liberated territory of Vis during World War II, and later worked as a club executive. Vušković's grandfather Mario, whom he was named after, attended the Hajduk academy in the 1970s and won a junior league title during Tomislav Ivić's tenure. Vušković's father Danijel is a former player who played as a defender. His brother Luka currently plays for Hajduk Split, while cousin Moreno plays as a forward at Litex Lovech.

He named Sergio Ramos as his football idol.

Career statistics

Club

Notes

References

External links
 
Mario Vušković at hajduk.hr

2001 births
Living people
Footballers from Split, Croatia
Association football defenders
Croatian footballers
Croatia youth international footballers
Croatia under-21 international footballers
HNK Hajduk Split players
HNK Hajduk Split II players
Hamburger SV players
First Football League (Croatia) players
Croatian Football League players
2. Bundesliga players
Croatian expatriate footballers
Expatriate footballers in Germany
Croatian expatriate sportspeople in Germany